The Noble County Courthouse is a historic courthouse in Albion, Noble County, Indiana.  It was designed by E.O. Fallis & Co. and was built in 1887.  It is a -story, Richardsonian Romanesque style red brick building with limestone trim. It has a steep hipped roof topped by a massive square center tower.

It was listed on the National Register of Historic Places in 1981.  It is located in the Albion Courthouse Square Historic District.

References

County courthouses in Indiana
Courthouses on the National Register of Historic Places in Indiana
Richardsonian Romanesque architecture in Indiana
Government buildings completed in 1887
Buildings and structures in Noble County, Indiana
National Register of Historic Places in Noble County, Indiana
Historic district contributing properties in Indiana